Loe sar Nekan  is the highest mountain peak in the province of Baluchistan in the southwest of Pakistan.

Loe sar Nekan is located 30 km east-north-east of the city of Quetta in the Zarghun Ghar mountain massif. Loe sar Nekan peak has a height of 3575 m (according to other sources 3578 m).

See also 
 Sulaiman Mountains

External links 
 Loe Nekan 
 peaklist.org
 Zarghun Mountain and the Water Supply of Quetta (PDF, engl.)

Mountains of Balochistan (Pakistan)